Kunersdorf station is a railway station in the Kunersdorf district in the municipality of Kolkwitz, located in the Spree-Neiße district in Brandenburg, Germany.

References

Railway stations in Brandenburg
Buildings and structures in Spree-Neiße